Lars-Ove "Larsa" Johansson (14 November 1938 – 11 November 2019) was a Swedish footballer who played as a forward, best known for representing Hammarby IF.

Club career
Johansson was born in Härnösand and started to play football with local club IF Älgarna, making his debut for the senior team at age 14 in the Swedish lower divisions. As a youngster, he reportedly attracted interest from Degerfors IF.

Before the 1956–57 season, Johansson instead transferred to Hammarby IF in Allsvenskan, the domestic top tier. Aged 18, he immediately established himself as a starting player, but Hammarby got relegated at the end of the year.

In 1957–58, Hammarby scored an impressive 117 goals in 33 fixtures throughout the campaign, with Johansson playing an integral part, getting instantly promoted from the second division.

Johansson established himself as a frequent starter for Hammarby in Allsvenskan between 1959 and 1963. He got known as a prolific goalscorer with a powerful shot, forming a fruitful partnership with forward Karl-Evert Skoglund.

Being plagued by injuries his whole career, Johansson only played one game Hammarby in 1964, now competing in the second tier again, and left the club at the end of the year. In total, Johansson made 116 league appearances for Hammarby, scoring 65 goals.

Johansson ended his career with IFK Västerås, playing two seasons before announcing his retirement in 1966, aged 28.

International career
After regularly featuring for the Swedish U21's and B-team, Johansson won his first and only senior cap for Sweden on 18 September 1960. He played the full game in a 1–3 loss against Norway, in an away friendly.

References

External links

1938 births
2019 deaths
People from Härnösand
Swedish footballers
Association football forwards
Allsvenskan players
Hammarby Fotboll players
IFK Västerås players
Sweden international footballers
Sportspeople from Västernorrland County